Oleh Vadymovych Filonov (born 22 July 2004) is a Ukrainian professional footballer who plays as an attacking midfielder for Ukrainian club Mariupol.

References

External links
 Profile on Mariupol official website
 
 

2004 births
Living people
Place of birth missing (living people)
Ukrainian footballers
Association football midfielders
FC Mariupol players
Ukrainian Premier League players